Illats is a commune in the Gironde department in Nouvelle-Aquitaine in southwestern France.

It was founded in the eleventh century.

Illats is part of the Graves wine-growing region. The Chateau Hillot winery is located here.

Population

See also
Communes of the Gironde department

References

External links

 Official site
 Communauté de Communes Convergence Garonne

Communes of Gironde